Bedelia is a 1946 British melodrama film directed by Lance Comfort and starring Margaret Lockwood, Ian Hunter and Barry K. Barnes. It is an adaptation of the 1945 novel Bedelia by Vera Caspary with events relocated from the United States, first to England and then to Monaco.

Plot
Bedelia is newly married and on her honeymoon in Monte Carlo with her husband, Charlie Carrington, in the autumn of 1938. She has a strong aversion to being photographed by her husband, claiming she is not photogenic. Spotting her in a sidewalk cafe, young painter Ben Chaney starts drawing a sketch of her; seeing this, she abruptly turns her head away. He encounters her husband and has a drink with the couple. When the husband notices a pearl ring, she claims it is a cheap piece of fake jewellery, though Chaney knows otherwise. He was speaking to a jewellery store proprietor when she picked up the ring; the expert offered her 100,000 francs for the flawless black pearl. Chaney begins probing into her past. In reality a detective, he suspects that Bedelia's obsession with money has led her to dispose of more than one husband for the insurance money.

Back in their mansion in England, Chaney is invited to begin a portrait.

Carrington becomes ill. Dr McAfee, his physician, confines him to bed and appoints a private nurse, Nurse Harris. Bedelia is told to sleep in a separate room. However Carrington's assistant has seen Chaney passing money to the nurse.

Over tea, Bedelia is shocked when the name of a sea captain arises in conversation: Captain McKelvey. A three-way female argument begins over control of the household, the nurse, the housekeeper and Bedelia, and the nurse is dismissed. Despite this, Bedelia runs off in a snow storm. Bringing her back she tells Charlie that she is scared of losing him.

Carrington and Chaney meet and discuss several background stories concerning Bedelia. These stories, shown as vignettes within the overall story, include a chemist in Edinburgh called McKelvey and a murdered husband, and a tale in France where a wife killed her husband, and a Mr Jacobs in Manchester, also killed. Chaney reveals himself as an investigator. He thinks Bedelia is a serial killer, motivated by large insurance policies.

Their cat dies soon after eating some smoked salmon, with Bedelia's hysterical response suggesting that she knew the salmon was poisoned. Then Charlie finds her with a bottle of poison in her hands. She claims she was trying to kill Chaney. She says she is very ill and offers Charlie the money she has made from her crimes, £45,000, but it is all too late.

Cast
 Margaret Lockwood as Bedelia Carrington
 Ian Hunter as Charlie Carrington
 Barry K. Barnes as Ben Chaney
 Anne Crawford as Ellen
 Beatrice Varley as Mary, Carrington's housekeeper
 Louise Hampton as Hannah
 Jill Esmond as Nurse Harris
 Julien Mitchell as Dr. McAfee
 Vi Stevens as Mrs. McAfee
 Kynaston Reeves as Mr. Bennett
 Olga Lindo as Mrs. Bennett
 John Salew as Alec Johnstone
 Barbara Blair as Sylvia Johnstone
 Daphne Arthur as Miss Jenkins
 Claude Bailey as Capt. McKelvey
 Ellen Pollock as McKelvey's Housekeeper
 Henry De Bray as M. Martin
 Marcel Poncin as M. Perrin
 Michael Martin Harvey as Abbé
 Sonia Sergyl as Abbé's Housekeeper
 Aubrey Mallalieu as Vicar
 Oscar Nation as Police Inspector

Production

Original novel
The film was based on a novel by Vera Caspary which was published in 1945. It was about a bachelor in his thirties called Charlie who married a widow, Bedelia, he meets at a summer resort in 1913. The New York Times said it was "guaranteed to raise gooseflesh on the hottest summer night." The Los Angeles Times called it "one of the neatest and cleverest jobs of writing this season."

Development
The film version of Caspary's novel Laura had been a big hit in 1944 and there was much interest in Bedelia even before publication. Caspary enjoyed the film of Laura although had some reservations. "Hollywood simply can't visualise a girl who leads her own life, and in whom sex is not uppermost", said Caspary. "They always show the career woman as either frustrated or freakish. I know lots of balanced professional women who can take love or let it alone."

This meant she was susceptible to approaches from British film companies as well as Hollywood. She also felt in Britain there was more respect for the writer. In late 1944 she sold the film rights to producer Isadore Goldsmith, who had impressed Caspary with The Stars Look Down, and wanted to set up the film in England. Goldsmith arranged financing through John Cornfield Productions, a unit of the Rank Organisation.

Caspary travelled to London to do an early draft of the script, which transplanted the action from Connecticut to Yorkshire.

"The movie will probably have one or two Hollywood names in it and will be an Arthur Rank release", said said. "Mr Rank is another who was wonderful to me – but then in England even the producers respect writers... England is counting on pictures to be one of her great export items."

Early contenders for the title role included Geraldine Fitzgerald, Vivien Leigh and Merle Oberon. Later on Marlene Dietrich, Valerie Hobson and Linden Travers were mentioned. Donald Woods, then appearing in a stage version of Laura, was a front-runner for the male lead.

Eventually Margaret Lockwood was cast in the lead, with Ian Hunter and Barry Barnes in support. It was Barnes' first film since The Girl in the News, also with Lockwood, and Hunter's first British film in 14 years. Jill Esmond, Laurence Olivier's first wife, was given a support role. The film was made with the American market very much in mind.

Shooting
Filming began December 1945. Filming was relatively elaborate by the standards of British filmmaking of the time. Production ended in April 1946.

Goldsmith later optioned the film rights to Caspary's next novel, Out of the Blue.

Alternative endings
Prior to filming, Goldsmith submitted the script to the Johnston office in the US (the censor). They had issues with the proposed ending, where Bedelia committed suicide with the tacit encouragement of her husband. It was decided to shoot an additional ending for the American market where Bedelia turned herself in to the police. This sequence cost $63,000. Lockwood thought it was "ridiculous" to have to shoot a new ending. Most British observers who saw the two endings preferred the suicide one.

When Goldsmith showed the final film to the US censor, they said he could use the British ending if he wanted. Goldsmith showed the film to various Hollywood observers and press and found they preferred the American ending. According to The New York Times, Goldsmith thought the difference of opinion between British and American observers went to "the relative position of women on the two sides of the Atlantic. Americans, he believes, prefer to see their heroines in the most favourable light, even at the sacrifice of integrity in character study."

In addition to this, some scenes had to be reshot for the US to reduce the extent of Lockwood's visible cleavage.

Reception

Box office
According to trade papers, the film was a "notable box office attraction" at British cinemas. Kinematograph Weekly reported that the "biggest winner" at the box office in 1946 Britain was The Wicked Lady starring Lockwood, with "runners up" being The Bells of St Marys, Piccadilly Incident, The Road to Utopia, Tomorrow is Forever, Brief Encounter, Wonder Man, Anchors Away, Kitty, The Captive Heart, The Corn is Green, Spanish Main, Leave Her to Heaven, Gilda (also from a novel by Vera Caspray), Caravan, Mildred Pierce, Blue Dahlia, Years Between, O.S.S., Spellbound, Courage of Lassie, My Reputation, London Town, Caesar and Cleopatra, Meet the Navy, Men of Two Worlds, Theirs is the Glory, The Overlanders, and Bedelia.

Lockwood wrote in her memoirs that although the film "was a great success, in truth had not done much to mollify my opinion of scripts in general."

U.S. release
The movie was the first released in America by Rank under its new agreement with Eagle-Lion Films, which Rank part owned. Rank hoped it would be a success, but it only grossed $350,000.

Critical
In terms of the critics, TV Guide noted, "Margaret Lockwood appears in one of her best villainous roles, played this time with subtlety"; while Leonard Maltin called the film "absorbing but not terribly suspenseful"; and The New York Times described it as "pretty much of a disappointment". In a retrospective review in 2010, Noir of the Week wrote, "Laura is often identified as one of the all-time great noir films...but in many ways, Bedelia is the better, more complex, and subversive film."

Filmink said the film would have "seemed like a sure thing" but was hurt by "odd scripting decisions, minimal atmosphere and lack of firepower amongst the support cast."

"They [the filmmakers] did very well by me, I think", said Caspary later. She went on to sign a ten-year contract with Eagle Lion, calling for one story a year.

Radio adaptation
Bedelia was presented on Hollywood Star Time 26 October 1946. Herbert Marshall and Gene Tierney starred in the adaptation.

References

External links

Bedelia at TCMDB
Review of film at The New York Times
Review of film at Variety

1946 films
1946 drama films
British black-and-white films
British historical drama films
1940s historical drama films
Eagle-Lion Films films
Ealing Studios films
Films based on American novels
Films based on crime novels
Films based on works by Vera Caspary
Films directed by Lance Comfort
Films set in 1938
Films set in Monaco
Films set in Yorkshire
Films set in England
1940s English-language films
1940s British films